Cynegetis is a genus of Coccinellidae native to Eurasia. The genus was first established by Chevrolat in 1837, and contains only three species.

Species 
Cynegetis contains three species:

 Cynegetis impunctata Linnaeus, 1958
 Cynegetis syriaca Mader, 1958
 Cynegetis chinensis Wang and Ren, 2014

Taxonomy

Description 
The species in the Cynegetis genus have oval and strongly convex bodies, well-developed spurs on all tibiae, and similar male and female genitalia. These descriptions are similar to the Subcoccinella genus and are also similar in their larvae, which have similar shapes and armatures of their body walls.

Distribution 
The genus is distributed in the Palaearctic region. In Europe, countries of occurrence include Austria, Belgium, Bosnia and Herzegovina, Czech Republic, Denmark, Finland, France, Germany, Hungary, Italy, Norway, Poland, Romania, Slovakia, Spain, Sweden, Switzerland, and Western Russia. In Asia, countries of occurrence include China (Ningxia), Eastern Russia (Maritime Province), Iran, North Korea, Syria, and Turkey.

References 

Coccinellidae genera
Beetles of Europe
Taxa named by Pierre François Marie Auguste Dejean